The 2022–23 Grambling State Tigers men's basketball team represents Grambling State University in the 2022–23 NCAA Division I men's basketball season. The Tigers, led by sixth-year head coach Donte Jackson, play their home games at the Fredrick C. Hobdy Assembly Center in Grambling, Louisiana as members of the Southwestern Athletic Conference.

Previous season
The Tigers finished the 2021–22 season 12–20, 9–9 in SWAC play to finish in a tie for sixth place. In the SWAC tournament, they defeated Southern in the quarterfinals before losing to second-seeded Texas Southern in the semifinals.

Roster

Schedule and results

|-
!colspan=12 style=| Non-conference regular season

|-
!colspan=12 style=| SWAC regular season

|-
!colspan=9 style=| SWAC tournament

Sources

References

Grambling State Tigers men's basketball seasons
Grambling State Tigers
Grambling State Tigers men's basketball
Grambling State Tigers men's basketball